Open class may refer to:

Open class (linguistics), a word class readily accepting new items
Open (sport)
Open class (track and field), an event classification
Open 60 Class, a type of monohull sailboat
FAI Open Class, a glider competition class with unlimited wingspan
Open class (computer programming), the ability to extend already-defined classes
IBM Open Class (IOC), a C++ class library
Open class system, a state of society